Tom or Thomas Dowling may refer to:
 Tom Dowling (American football) (1940–2018), American football coach
 Tom Dowling (rugby league) (1907–1969), Australian rugby league player
 Thomas Joseph Dowling (1840–1924), Canadian Roman Catholic bishop